Monk's Cloth is a loosely woven cotton or linen fabric made of coarser yarns that drape well.

Basketweave 
The Monk's cloth was woven with basketweave, usually with 2x2 or 4x4. Basketweave is a plain weave, with the difference that it allows two or more filling yarn to pass over and under two or more warp yarns and forms a check pattern.

Characteristics
This cloth has a loose over and under four strand weave. These strands are called floats and are used to weave the threads through. The cloth is 100% cotton and can be purchased in a variety of colors at craft and fabric stores. The cotton will shrink when washed, so should be pre-washed before so as to achieve the correct sizing before stitching.

Use 
In the 1940s monk's cloth was used to decorate borders on towels, throws, baby blankets, pillows, wall hanging, pictures, linens and clothing. Swedish dresses were decorated for traditional outfits with a variety of threads. Today, cotton Floss and yarns are used on the fabric to create beautifully decorated items.

See also 
Basketweave

References 

Weaving
Swedish culture